Kialla is a suburb within the City of Greater Shepparton local government area in the Goulburn Valley, Victoria, Australia. At the 2016 census, Kialla and surrounding area had a population of approximately 6,800.

Kialla includes the areas known as Kialla Central, Kialla West, Kialla Green and Kialla Lakes. Kialla Lakes is a major housing estate established in northern Kialla, with three man-made lakes to provide scenery. Houses with lake frontage sell for a premium price.

History
Kialla Post Office opened on 2 January 1874 and closed in 1918.

Population
According to the 2016 census of population, there were 6,817 people in Kialla, of which:

 1.6% were Aboriginals and/or Torres Strait Islanders
 82.6% were born in Australia
 82.9% spoke only English at home. Other languages spoken at home included Italian at 1.9%
 28.0% were Catholic, 27.5% declared no religion, and 12.0% were Anglican

Sport
Shepparton Harness Racing Club conducts regular meetings at its racetrack in Kialla.

The Shepparton Greyhound Racing Club holds regular greyhound racing meetings at its track on the Goulburn Valley Highway in Kialla. The track opened on 10 December 2005.

Golfers play at the Kialla Golf Club on Kialla Central Road.

See also
 Shepparton
 Broken River (Victoria)
 Seven Creeks
 Goulburn River

References

Towns in Victoria (Australia)
City of Greater Shepparton